Diclofensine (Ro 8-4650) was developed by Hoffmann-La Roche in the 1970s in the search for a new antidepressant. It was found that the (S)-isomer was responsible for activity. Is a stimulant drug which acts as a triple monoamine reuptake inhibitor, primarily inhibiting the reuptake of dopamine and norepinephrine, with affinities (Ki) of 16.8 nM, 15.7 nM, and 51 nM for DAT, NET, and SERT (dopamine, norepinephrine and serotonin transporters), respectively. It was found to be an effective antidepressant in human trials, with relatively few side effects, but was ultimately dropped from clinical development, possibly due to concerns about its abuse potential.

Diclofensine is chemically a tetrahydroisoquinoline (THIQ) derivative, as is nomifensine.

Synthesis

The condensation of m-anisaldehyde [591-31-1] (1) with methylamine gives N-methyl-3-methoxybenzenemethanimine [16928-30-6]. Reduction of this Schiff-base intermediate with sodium borohydride gives (3-methoxybenzyl)methylamine [41789-95-1] (2). Alkylation of this with 3,4-dichlorophenacylbromide [2632-10-2] (3) would give CID:59580342 (4). Reduction of the benzoyl ketone with sodium borohydride gives the alcohol [802051-24-7] (5). Acid catalyzed intramolecular cyclization then completes the synthesis of the 4-aryl-THIQ derivative, diclofensine (6).

See also 
 Brasofensine
 Sertraline
 Tesofensine

References 

Chlorobenzenes
Phenol ethers
Tetrahydroisoquinolines
Serotonin–norepinephrine–dopamine reuptake inhibitors
Stimulants